York Art Gallery is a public art gallery in York, England, with a collection of paintings from 14th-century to contemporary, prints, watercolours, drawings, and ceramics. It closed for major redevelopment in 2013, reopening in summer of 2015. The building is a Grade II listed building and is managed by York Museums Trust.

History

Foundation and development
The gallery was created to provide a permanent building as the core space for the second Yorkshire Fine Art and Industrial Exhibition of 1879, the first in 1866 having occupied a temporary chalet in the grounds of Bootham Asylum. The 1866 exhibition, which ran from 24 July to 31 October 1866 was attended by over 400,000 people and yielded a net profit for the organising committee of £1,866. A meeting of this committee in April 1867 committed to "applying this surplus in providing some permanent building to be devoted to the encouragement of Art and Industry".

The result was the development of a second exhibition, housed in a newly constructed building designed by a York architect named Edward Taylor; a series of 189 drawings, watercolours and sketches for the proposed gallery were produced by Taylor in the period 1874–1878. The architectural plan for the building changed considerably during this time, from an 'Elizabethan' style to an 'Italian' style – neither were fully realised in the final design. The building first opened on 7 May 1879.

The site for the 1879 exhibition was an area in the grounds of the medieval St Mary's Abbey known as 'Bearparks Garden'. It is fronted by what became Exhibition Square, which was cleared by the demolition of a house and the former Bird in Hand Hotel. The art gallery consisted of an entrance hall, central hall, north and south galleries and on the upper floor a Grand Picture Saloon. Its intended grand classical façade decorated with 18 stone figures, a carved tympanum and 14 mosaics was not done for financial reasons and it was decorated instead with two tiled panels representing 'Leonardo expiring in the arms of Francis I', and 'Michaelangelo showing his Moses', together with four ceramic roundels depicting York artists William Etty (painter), John Carr (architect), John Camidge (musician), and John Flaxman (sculptor). To the rear of the building was a large temporary exhibition hall with machinery annex. A large organ was placed in the building, originally built in 1862 by William Telford of Dublin. Each side of the covered way between the hall and the stone building was used for refreshments with a cafe on one side and a first-class lounge on the other. A large cellar was excavated below in order to store liquor for these rooms.

The exhibition hall was intended to be used only for three years, but remained in use for meetings, concerts and other functions until 1909 and was not demolished until the Second World War.

Following the 1879 exhibition the renamed Yorkshire Fine Art and Industrial Institution aimed to create a permanent art exhibition. It was given a major boost by the bequest of York collector John Burton (1799–1882) of more than one hundred 19th-century paintings, supplemented by gifts and in the early years two major temporary loan collections. In 1888 the north galleries were leased to York School of Art, which moved there in 1890 from Minster Yard. 

York City Council purchased the buildings and collection in 1892. Temporary summer exhibitions ceased in 1903 but a major exhibition of the work of York artist William Etty was held in 1911 when his statue by local sculptor George Walker Milburn was erected outside.

In 1888 the north wing was leased to York Art School which added a further storey in 1905, and after that the wing was vacated by the school. It housed the city archives from 1977 to 2012.

Second World War
The period up to the commencement of the Second World War was one of modest growth, the major event being purchase of the Dr William Arthur Evelyn collection of prints, drawings and watercolours of York in 1931. The building was requisitioned for military purposes at the outbreak of the Second World War and closed, suffering bomb damage during the Baedeker Blitz on 29 April 1942.

Post-War

The gallery reopened in 1948 with a small temporary exhibition before a major restoration in 1951–52 after which began a major revival of fortune under the direction of Hans Hess. He made important acquisitions with the assistance of the York Art Collection Society founded in 1948 (later Friends of York Art Gallery) and the National Art Collections Fund, and then in 1955 the donation of FD Lycett Green's collection of more than one hundred continental Old Master paintings. As a result of the systematic build up under Hess and his successors, the gallery has a British collection especially of late-19th-century and early-20th-century works with some French works representative of influential styles.

In 1963 the gallery was given Eric Milner-White's collection of studio pottery.

Later 20th century
In the 1990s and 2000s the collection was supplemented by other major donations and loans, most notably those of WA Ismay and Henry Rothschild (1913–2009).

1999 robbery
In January 1999 the gallery was victim of an armed robbery, during which staff were tied up and threatened, and over £700,000 of paintings were stolen.
At closing time, four members of staff were threatened by two men bearing pistols and wearing ski masks. They took a watercolour by J. M. W. Turner from a display case and 19 other paintings from the walls, cutting some of those from their frames. 

The main perpetrator, Craig Townsend, was arrested by armed police when he, and another man, arrived at an arranged meeting with an art dealer to sell the stolen paintings. He was sentenced to 14 years in jail at York Crown Court in February 2000 for the robbery.

21st century
The gallery underwent a £445,000 refurbishment in 2005, reopening on 19 March. This development was supported by a £272,700 grant from the Heritage Lottery Fund and £85,000 from the City of York Council.

A restoration in 2013–15 cost £8 million, and was undertaken to increase display space by some 60%, including reincorporation of the north wing, an upper-floor extension to the south wing, and reorganisation of the internal space for exhibition and storage. The development enabled the area to the rear of the building to be restored to public use as part of the Museum Gardens. The reopened gallery houses the British Studio Ceramics on the upper floor. The gallery reopened on 1 August 2015, charging an admission fee for the first time since 2002. The first year after the gallery reopened with a new charging structure saw visitor numbers fall by over 120,000 to 91,896 compared to the year 2011–2012 when there was no admission charge.

During the 2020 exhibition of paintings by Harland Miller ("Harland Miller: York, So Good They Named it Once") it was reported that commemorative posters sold in the Art Gallery gift shop were being resold online for up to £1,000. The posters depicted a reworked version of Miller's 2009 work 'York – So Good They Named It Once'; part of his 'Pelican Bad Weather' series of humorous book covers.

In November 2020 the gallery announced that it had acquired works following a successful application to the Derbyshire School Library Service, which had owned the works but closed in 2018. The works acquired are by four British artists: Prunella Clough, Margaret Mellis, Marion Grace Hocken, and Daphne Fedarb.

COVID-19 pandemic
During the COVID-19 pandemic the gallery, along with the other York Museums Trust sites, closed to the public on 23 March 2020. It was announced in July that the gallery would reopen on 1 August (Yorkshire Day) 2020 and that it would not charge visitors. The gallery was forced to close a second time from 5 November 2020 as part of new national restrictions in England. It reopened on 1 December 2020, but York was moved into Tier 3 Restrictions on 31 December 2020, forcing the gallery to close again. In March 2021 it was announced that the Art Gallery would reopen on 28 May to coincide with the launch of a new exhibition 'Grayson Perry: The Pre-Therapy Years'.

Collection

Paintings 

The gallery has more than 1,000 paintings. Western European paintings include 14th-century Italian altarpieces, Annibale Carracci's early 17th-century Portrait of monsignor Giovanni Battista Agucchi, 17th-century Dutch morality works, and 19th-century works by French artists who were predecessors and contemporaries of the Impressionists. British paintings date from the 16th century onward, with 17th and 18th-century portraits and paintings by Giambattista Pittoni and vedutas by Bernardo Bellotto, Victorian morality works and early 20th-century work by the Camden Town Group associated with Walter Sickert being particularly strong. Among the contemporaries, Paul Nash, L. S. Lowry and Ben Nicholson and the Swiss-born Luigi Pericle. Amongst York born artists the gallery has the largest collection of works by William Etty and good paintings by Albert Moore. Henry Keyworth Raine, the great nephew of William Powell Frith, gifted various works, including a portrait of George Kirby (1845–1937), the First Curator of York Art gallery.

Studio pottery 
The gallery holds a collection of British studio ceramics with more than 5,000 pieces. They include works by Bernard Leach, Shoji Hamada, William Staite Murray, Michael Cardew, Lucie Rie, Hans Coper, Jim Malone and Michael Casson.

Works on paper 
The collection of more than 17,000 drawings, watercolours and prints is particularly strong in views of York, with more than 4,000 examples, largely watercolours and drawings, some by local artists such as Henry Cave, John Harper, John Browne and Patrick Hall. Watercolour artists represented include Thomas Rowlandson, John Varley, Thomas Girtin, J. M. W. Turner, and 20th-century painters Edward Burra, John Piper and Julian Trevelyan. The gallery holds the William Etty archive.

Decorative arts 
There are more than 3,000 decorative objects particularly from Yorkshire potteries from the 16th century to the early 20th century, Chinese and Korean pottery from the 18th and 19th century, and glassware.

Curators and directors

Exhibitions in York Art Gallery
Many exhibitions have taken place in the gallery, of varying sizes and length.

2009
"3 Collectors: Gallery of Pots" (10 September 2009–9 May 2010). An exhibition of decorative arts by Bill Ismay, Eric Milner-White, and Henry Rothschild.

2011
Bigger Trees Near Warter by David Hockney (10 February 2011–22 June 2011).
"William Etty – Art and Controversy" (25 June 2011–22 January 2012)

2012
"Gordon Baldwin – Objects for a Landscape" (11 February 2011–10 June 2012).

2015
The restoration of York Art Gallery in 2013–2015 created several new gallery spaces, including the Burton Gallery and the Centre of Ceramic Art (CoCA).

The Burton Gallery is a permanent exhibition gallery including works by Edward Matthew Ward, L. S. Lowry, and William Etty.
"History of British Studio Pottery" (opened 2015). This is the permanent exhibition in the CoCA gallery.
"Manifest: 10,000 Hours". An installation by Clare Twomey in the CoCA Gallery of 10,000 slipware bowls cast by members of the public.
"Production Line" by Phoebe Cummings.

2016
"Flesh: Skin and Surface" (23 September 2016–19 March 2017). An exhibition on the representation of flesh.
"Pathways of Patients" (9 December 2016–23 April 2017). An exhibition in the CoCA gallery by six artists commission by the University of York’s Centre for Chronic Diseases and Disorders (C2D2) to highlights connections between art and science.

2017
"Kate Haywood – Hoard" (3 August 2017–3 December 2017). An exhibition by Kate Haywood in the CoCA gallery exploring the relationships between people and objects.

2018
"Sara Radstone: More than Words" (5 January 2018–5 June 2018). An exhibition in the CoCA gallery of more than fifty works by Sara Radstone.
"Lucie Rie: Ceramics & Buttons" (22 June 2018–3 November 2019). An exhibition of small works by Lucie Rie. 
"When All is Quiet: Kaiser Chiefs in Conversation with York Art Gallery" (14 December 2018–10 March 2019). An exhibition curated by the Kaiser Chiefs.

2019
"Ruskin, Turner & The Storm Cloud: watercolours and Drawings" (29 March 2019–23 June 2019). A partnership exhibition between York Art Gallery and Abbot Hall Art Gallery on works by John Ruskin and J M W Turner.
"Coast to Coast" (26 July 2019–26 July 2020).
"Sounds like Her" (13 July 2019–15 September 2019), an exhibition by women artists on sound art curated by Christine Eyene.
"Making a Masterpiece – Bouts and Beyond (1450–2020)" (11 October 2019–6 January 26, 2020).
"Gillian Lowndes: At the Edge" (23 November 2019 – May 2020), an exhibition of ceramic works by Gillian Lowndes.

2020
"Harland Miller: York, So Good They Named it Once" (14 February 2020–31 May 2020), an exhibition of paintings by Harland Miller and the largest solo show of the artist to date.
"Human Nature" (21 October 2020–24 January 2021), a digital arts exhibition hosted as part of York Mediale 2020. As a result of new restrictions in England due to the COVID-19 Pandemic, the gallery was forced to close in November 2020 and the "Human Nature" exhibition was extended until May 2021.

2021
'Grayson Perry: The Pre-therapy Years' (28 May 2021–5 September 2021), an exhibition in the Centre of Ceramic Art re-introducing works Perry made between 1982 and 1994.
'Pictures of the Floating World: Japanese Ukiyo-e Prints' (opened 28 May 2021), an exhibition featuring Ukiyo-e prints.

2022
A takeover of the gallery by Curious Arts was announced on 9 February. The takeover featured Drag Storytime and workshops in protest-poster making in support of LGBT History Month.
'Beyond Bloomsbury: Life, Love, and Legacy' (5 March 2022–5 June 2022), an exhibition in partnership with the National Portrait Gallery and Sheffield Galleries and Museums Trust explored the Bloomsbury Group.
'Sin' (7 October 2022–22 January 2023), an exhibition in partnership with the National Gallery exploring the concept of sin through art. The exhibition included classic works by Lucas Cranach the Elder and Rembrandt van Rijn, and contemporary works by Tracey Emin and Ron Mueck.
'Marvellous and Mischievous: Literature's Young Rebels' (10 February 2023 – 4 June 2023), an exhibition from the British Library of more than forty books and artworks showcasing "rebels, outsiders and spirited survivors" from children’s literature.

Artist's Garden
The Artist's Garden is an outdoor exhibition space behind the Art Gallery, within the York Museum Gardens. Sculptural exhibitions have been displayed in this open air space since 2016. Exhibitions have included:

Foundation Myths by Charles Holland (2016–2017) was the first exhibition in the Artist's Garden.
Leisureland Golf by Doug Fishbourne (June–September 2017) was a fully playable crazy-golf course and sculptural installation.
The Pollinarium (27 September – 6 October 2018) was a timber structure, covered with flowering plants and shown as part of the York Mediale.
Michael Lyons: Ancient and Modern (25 May 2019 – May 2020) was a series of sculptures by Michael Lyons. It was the first time such a large exhibition of outdoor sculpture had been displayed in York.

Awards

Visit York Tourism Awards: Visitor Attraction of the Year 2016 (Over 50,000 Visitors category) (winner).
Art Fund: Museum of the Year 2016 (finalist).
Kids in Museums: Family Friendly Museum Award 2016 (winner).
European Museum Forum: European Museum of the Year 2017 (nominated). Special commendation received.

References

External links 

York Art Gallery website
Art UK – Paintings held by York Museums Trust
W A Ismay – at the Google Cultural Institute
Yorkshire fine art & industrial exhibition, York, 1879 – fine art department

Museums in York
Art museums and galleries in North Yorkshire
Grade II listed buildings in York
Cultural infrastructure completed in 1879
Decorative arts museums in England
Ceramics museums in the United Kingdom
Art museums established in 1882
1882 establishments in England
York Museums Trust